Kanjiramattam Sree Mahadeva Temple, is a Hindu Temple situated on the river banks of Thodupuzha River at Kanjiramattam Kara (land), Thopdupuzha Taluk, Idukki District, India.

References

Shiva temples in Kerala
Hindu temples in Idukki district
108 Shiva Temples